A Master of Science in Supply Chain Management (abbreviated SCM or MSSCM) is a type of 
postgraduate academic master's degree awarded by universities in many countries. This degree is typically studied for in Supply Chain Management and Logistics.

Curriculum structure
The Master of Science in Supply Chain Management is a one to three years Master Degree, depending on the program, some may even start with two-year preparation classes and covers various areas of Supply chain management.

Topics of study may include:

 Customer-driven supply chain (link broken)
 Customer relationship management
 Demand chain management
 Electronic data interchange
 Enterprise planning systems
 Enterprise resource planning
 Integrated business planning
 Inventory control system
 Just-in-Time
 Liquid logistics
 Logistics management
 Material Requirements Planning
 Military supply chain management
 Operations management
 Order fulfillment
 Procurement
 Quality assurance
 Reverse logistics
 Supply chain network
 Supply chain security
 Total Quality Management
 Vendor-managed inventory

Institutions with MS Supply Chain Management Degree Programs
According to the 2017 Eduniversal's Best Masters Ranking, the follow institutions ranked best with their SCM-related Master's programs:

Massachusetts Institute of Technology - In collaboration with Malaysia Institute for Supply Chain Innovation for Malaysia based program
Purdue University
Universidade Nova de Lisboa
Pontifical Catholic University of Peru
KEDGE Business School
Copenhagen Business School
Universidad Complutense de Madrid
Bocconi University
MIP Politecnico di Milano
Université Paris-Dauphine
Schulich School of Business

See also 
 List of master's degrees
 CSCMP Supply Chain Process Standards

References

Master's degrees